(Henry) George Nelson, 2nd Baron Nelson of Stafford (2 January 1917 — 19 January 1995) was an English engineer who made a notable contribution to the development of civil nuclear power.

Background
George Nelson was born in Stretford Manchester, as the only son of the electrical engineer George Nelson, later Baron Nelson, who, over 30 years, led English Electric from 4,000 to 80,000 employees. His mother, who came to be known as Jane, was born Florence Mabel Howe and was the only daughter of a Leicestershire JP. The younger Nelson was educated at Oundle School and King's College of the University of Cambridge where he won an exhibition and took his degree in the Mechanical Sciences Tripos. After two years of practical experience in France and Switzerland and the onset of war in 1939 he was appointed superintendent of English Electric's Preston works.

English Electric
When English Electric bought D Napier & Son in 1942 George Nelson was appointed Napier's managing director. He moved from Napier's in 1949 to become deputy managing director of English Electric and was appointed managing director in 1956 following his father. By the age of 40 he was on the main board of English Electric. He was appointed chairman on his father's death in 1962. In 1968 English Electric was taken over by GEC. Nelson was appointed chairman of GEC and held that appointment for 15 years until his retirement in 1983 though he remained a further four years on the GEC main board even after retirement as chairman.

British Aircraft Corporation
He continued his association with military aviation begun at Preston in 1939. When English Electric merged aviation operations with Vickers and Bristol in 1960 he was appointed one of two deputies to the chairman, Lord Portal and remained deputy chairman until 1977.

Nuclear power
Nelson moved English Electric into nuclear power generation as a part of the consortium Atomic Power Construction Company Ltd to build the Sizewell and Hinkley Point nuclear power stations.

Outside interests

UK's first business and management schools
George Nelson led the campaign to raise funds for UK's first business and management schools, London and Manchester, and was particularly proud of his appointment as the first chancellor of Aston University. in which position he served from 1966 until 1979.

Nelson was a director of the Bank of England for more than 25 years, 1961 to 1987.

He was a member of the three engineering institutions —  electrical, mechanical and civil — and served as president of the Institution of Electrical Engineers in 1970. He also served for many years on the Engineering & Allied Employers National Federation later the Engineering Employers' Federation.

He served on many public bodies including the civil service selection board and the Advisory Council on Technology.

Nelson died at Stafford 19 January 1995 survived by his wife who he had married on 8 Jun 1940, Pamela Roy Bird, the daughter of Ernest Roy Bird MP, of New House Farm, Robertsbridge, Sussex. They had two sons and two daughters. His elder son, the Hon Henry Roy George Nelson, inherited his title as 3rd Baron Nelson of Stafford.

References

1917 births
1995 deaths
Barons in the Peerage of the United Kingdom
Businesspeople from Manchester
Engineers from Manchester
Alumni of King's College, Cambridge
20th-century British engineers
20th-century English businesspeople